Leonard Garvey Pitts Jr. (born October 11, 1957) is an American commentator, journalist, and novelist. He is a nationally syndicated columnist and winner of the 2004 Pulitzer Prize for Commentary. He was originally hired by the Miami Herald to critique music, but quickly received his own column, in which he has dealt extensively with race, politics, and culture from a progressive perspective.

Raised in Los Angeles and educated at the University of Southern California, Pitts currently lives in Bowie, Maryland. He has won awards for his writing from the Society of Professional Journalists, the American Society of Newspaper Editors, and the National Association of Black Journalists, and he was first nominated for the Pulitzer Prize in 1993, eventually claiming the honor in 2004.

Pitts is a bestselling author. His first book, Becoming Dad: Black Men and the Journey to Fatherhood, was published in 2006. His first novel, Before I Forget, was released in March 2009, and earned a starred review from Publishers Weekly. The novel centers on a faded soul singer whose early-onset Alzheimer's disease compels him to reconnect with his father and son.  Pitts's third book, Forward from This Moment: Selected Columns, 1994–2008, was published in August 2009. It is a selection of his columns from the Miami Herald.

Pitts gained national recognition for his widely circulated column of September 12, 2001, "We'll go forward from this moment", in which he described the toughness of the American spirit in the face of the September 11 attacks.

Controversy
In June 2007, Pitts was the subject of a campaign of death threats and harassment, including neo-Nazi Bill White, who were angry at a column he wrote about the murders of Channon Christian and Christopher Newsom, a white couple who were raped and murdered by five black assailants in Knoxville, Tennessee. In his column addressing the murders, Pitts wrote:

More death threats were made in April 2008 before his appearance at the University of Puget Sound.

Books

Non-fiction

Fiction

References

External links

Official site
Gregg Fields, "Herald columnist Pitts wins Pulitzer for commentary", Miami Herald, April 6, 2004
Recent columns

1957 births
Living people
20th-century African-American people
21st-century African-American writers
21st-century American male writers
21st-century American non-fiction writers
21st-century American novelists
African-American journalists
African-American novelists
American columnists
American male non-fiction writers
American male novelists
American political writers
John C. Fremont High School alumni
Miami Herald people
Pulitzer Prize for Commentary winners
University of Southern California alumni
Writers from Los Angeles